Kao Yip Middle School is a preschool through secondary school in Sé (Cathedral Parish), Macau. It was founded in 1910 and merged with the Confucianism Middle School and Silver Leaves Primary School in 1975. Kao Yip Middle School is the only school in Macau with Confucianism as a principle.

See also
 Education in Macau
 List of secondary schools in Macau

References

External links

 Official website

Sources
 http://www.kaoyip.edu.mo/
 http://www.kaoyip.edu.mo/#/single-article/568f5f0c3c1053ad3200000e
 https://www.macaucentral.com/education/208-2009-03-05-21-32-30

Schools in Macau
Educational institutions established in 1910
1910s establishments in Macau
Sé, Macau
1910 establishments in the Portuguese Empire